During the Second World War, a British infantry brigade consisted of multiple battalions and was commanded by a brigadier. Generally, three infantry brigades would form an infantry division, although brigades could be used as independent formations in which case, they were usually assigned to a corps-level command to be utilised. Brigades were flexible formations and rarely maintained the same battalions. Likewise, brigades could be moved from division to division or higher-level commands, as the tactical or strategic need arose. Their role could also vary dramatically, from being a combat formation to becoming a training organisation. Over the course of the war, the British Army had 216 uniquely numbered or named brigade formations. However, not all existed at the same time, and several were formed by renaming or renumbering existing formations. This article focuses on all brigades numbered between 1 and 100. Those numbered above 100 or named, are located within their own list.

During the Second World War, the British Army was split between two branches: the regular army, made up of full-time professionals; and the Territorial Army (TA), which comprised part-time reservists. The TA was seen as the primary way to expand the size of the British military during a war. To do so, the existing TA formations, which were referred to as the first-line, would create a new formation based around a cadre of soldiers. The new formation, referred to as the second-line, would then be expanded until it reached full strength. The regular army also created new brigades when existing infantry battalions were grouped together. The expansion of British African regiments also saw the creation of many additional infantry brigades.

Background

During the Second World War, the infantry was the backbone of the British Army. Within the British Army, the infantry was organised into regiments, however, these were administrative structures and not operational units. The fighting unit of an infantry regiment was the battalion, and a regiment could field numerous battalions. A brigade generally consisted of three infantry battalions commanded by a brigadier, and were around 2,500-men strong.

Brigades were not set formations, and their composition and role could change because of tactical or strategic demands. For example, the 9th Infantry Brigade contained the same three battalions throughout the course of the war. In contrast, the 16th Infantry Brigade had 17 different battalions under its command during the war. It was unusual for a brigade to consist solely of battalions from one regiment. From the list below, excluding the brigades raised in Africa, only the 35th (Queen's Royal Regiment (West Surrey)), the 53rd (Royal Norfolk Regiment), and the 61st Infantry Brigades (Rifle Brigade (The Prince Consort's Own)) contained more than one battalion from the same regiment. Of these, only the 35th maintained the battalions from one regiment throughout the course of the brigade's existence. A brigade could be an independent formation, answerable only to a high-level command, or one assigned to a division. Those assigned to divisions could be switched between formations depending on the strategic need. For example, the 9th and the 10th Infantry Brigades never left their respective divisions throughout the entire course of the war, whereas the 16th Infantry Brigade was assigned to seven different divisions, six corps-level commands, and three strategic commands. In combat, brigades were provided support from artillery, engineers, and other supporting arms as needed. Generally, these assets belonged to the higher formations that the brigade belonged to.

The British Army was split into two branches: the regular army, which numbered 224,000 men with a reserve of 173,700 at the start of the war, and the part-time Territorial Army (TA), which numbered 438,100 with a reserve of around 20,750 men. The main goal of the regular army, built largely around battalion-size units, was to maintain the peace and defend the British Empire. David Fraser, a historian and a former general, argued that during the inter-war period, the British Army did not field a force of infantry brigades and divisions; those that officially existed, did so only on paper. While battalions were organised into brigades, they were dispersed and were deficient in artillery, communication, engineer, logistical, and transportation assets. In the event of war, brigades ready and equipped to fight as part of a division would need to be assembled from the available battalions, while other forces required for brigades and divisions would have to be raised. At the outset of war, the regular army had 24 infantry brigades. The majority of them were stationed within the UK, although there were six based in the Middle East, one garrisoned in Malta, and one each based in West Africa, British Malaya, and Hong Kong. The British Army also increased the recruitment within their African regiments, in particular the Nigeria Regiment, the Gold Coast Regiment, and the King's African Rifles, which resulted in numerous brigades being formed in east (Kenya, Northern Rhodesia, Nyasaland, Tanganyika, and Uganda), and west Africa. Over the course of the war, 140 regular army brigades would be raised, although they would not all exist at the same time, and many were re-designated from one number or name to another.

The TA was intended to be the primary method of expanding the number of formations available to the British Army. However, during the inter-war period, the British government reduced the funding and size of the TA. By 1936, they had concluded the TA could not be modernised or equipped for a European war over the following three-year period, and therefore delayed further funding. Following the German occupation of the remnants of the Czechoslovak state in March 1939, the TA was ordered to be doubled in size. At the beginning of 1939, the TA had 35 infantry brigades. The existing formations, termed the first-line, were ordered to create a second formation using a cadres of trained personnel. The new formations were termed the second-line, and the process was termed "duplicating". By the outbreak of the war, some of these second-line brigades had been formed while others were still being created. By the end of 1939, the TA had increased to 32 first-Line and 32 second-line infantry brigades.

During the 1939–1940 period, each brigade of the British Expeditionary Force was assigned a company of nine French 25 mm Hotchkiss anti-tank guns. After the Battle of France and the Dunkirk evacuation, additional brigade anti-tank companies were formed and equipped with the Ordnance QF 2-pounder anti-tank gun. Over the course of the following year, these companies were disbanded. The British Army implemented lessons learnt from the battle of France. This included brigades, in the UK, being reorganised into brigade groups, which involved attaching artillery, anti-aircraft guns, anti-tank guns, machine guns, and engineers to them. This change was then implemented in brigades overseas. Brigades, which were attached to a division and organised in this fashion, compromised the division's ability to centralise and concentrate artillery fire to support the infantry brigades. After training exercises in the UK demonstrated the weakness of these formations, those based within the UK were reorganised as regular brigades and the additional units reassigned back to being divisional assets. These groups, due to a lack of firepower and not being concentrated with other formations, were engaged in several one-sided affairs against Axis divisional size forces and defeated.

Infantry brigades

See also 
 British Army during the Second World War
 British deception formations in World War II
 British infantry brigades of the First World War
 List of British infantry brigades of the Second World War (101–308 and named)

Notes
 Footnotes

 Citations

References

 
 
 
 
 
 
 
 
 
 
 
 
 

British infantry brigades (1-100)
Infantry brigades (1-100)
Infantry brigades (1-100)
Infantry brigades of the British Army in World War II